Alseodaphne semecarpifolia is a species of 18m tall plant in the family Lauraceae. It is a tree endemic to Western Ghats and Sri Lanka. It is threatened by habitat loss. Bark is brown in color. Leaves are simple, alternate; lamina obovate, apex obtuse or rounded; base cuneate to acute; margin entire; 6 to 10 secondary nerves. Flowers show panicles inflorescence. Fruit is a one-seeded berry.

Common names
Marathi - phudgus (फुडगुस) 
Tamil - kanaippirandai (கணைப்பிரண்டை ) 
Malayalam - mulaknaari (മുളക്നാറി ) 
Telugu - naaramaamidi (నారమామిడి ) 
Kannada - nelthare (ನೆಲ್ಥರೆ ) 
Konkani - rani (राणी ) 
Sinhala - Wewarani (වෑවරන)

References

semecarpifolia
Flora of India (region)
Flora of Sri Lanka